Mutchler is a surname. Notable people with the surname include:

Howard Mutchler (1859–1916), American politician
William Mutchler (1831–1893), American politician

See also
6815 Mutchler, a main-belt asteroid